Namunukula, literally "Nine Peaks" in Sinhala language, is the name of a mountain range in Sri Lanka's province of Uva. The nearby town is also sometimes called Namunukula Town.

During the Ming treasure voyages of the 15th century, the Chinese fleet led by Admiral Zheng He made use of this geographical feature in their navigation to Sri Lanka, as the mountain is the first visible landmark of Sri Lanka after departing from Sumatra.

See also 
 Badulla

References 

Mountain ranges of Sri Lanka
Landforms of Badulla District
Two-thousanders of Asia
Populated places in Uva Province